The Tunisian women's national rugby union sevens team is Tunisia's representative in women's rugby sevens. Tunisia competed at the 2020 Women's Rugby Sevens Final Olympic Qualification Tournament. They placed fourth at the 2019 Africa Women's Sevens but because South Africa declined an Olympics qualification, Kenya earned the automatic qualifying spot which allowed Madagascar and Tunisia to compete at the final Olympic Qualification Tournament.

Tournament History

Rugby World Cup Sevens

Summer Olympics

Women's Africa Cup Sevens

Current squad
Tunisian national team's list in the first matches of the African Cup of Nations preliminary matches.
Amal Dardouri
Halima Charrada
Falfoul Sandaise
Hajer Saoudi
Baya Ajroud
Yasmine Korbi
Nour  Jalali
Emna Zarai

See also
Rugby union in Tunisia

References

Women's national rugby sevens teams
W